Ollie Phillips (born  in Brighton) is a former English professional rugby union player.

Phillips combined successful careers in both the 15-a-side game and also the Olympic version of the game, Rugby Sevens. Phillips captained England Sevens and was named '7s World Rugby Player of the Year' in 2009 while also pursuing a professional career in 15s with four clubs in England and France, where he was voted 'Overseas Player of the Year' in 2011.

Since retiring from rugby, Phillips has volunteered as a charity ambassador. He currently works as a Director at PWC in London and in 2018 set up 'Optimist Performance', through which he works with companies and individuals by speaking and consulting in the core areas of: Teamwork, Leadership, Resilience and Change.

Philipps was born in Brighton, and studied at Durham University, where he was a member of Van Mildert College, graduating in 2004. He later studied for an MBA at Cambridge, where he won a blue in the Varsity Match.

Rugby
He is the most successful England Rugby Sevens captain leading his team to three World Series Cup victories - including in New Zealand - and six finals. In 2009, he was voted World Rugby Seven’s player of the year.

Away from the international stage he plied his trade as a 15-a-side professional at wing and full-back for four clubs: Harlequins, Newcastle Falcons, Stade Français and Gloucester Rugby. In all, he played in three Heineken Cups, a European Cup Final, and was voted Best Overseas Player in France in 2011.

Charity Adventures
Phillips has sailed around the world, cycled across America, run marathons in Africa, etc. for  Street Child, Alzheimers Society, Wooden Spoon and Cancer Research UK. He is also an ambassador for the government-driven GREAT campaign working with the Clipper Round the World Race.

Clipper Round the World Race - Phillips took part in September 2013. After 11 months and 40,000 miles, the team finished second overall.

Arctic Guinness World Record - Phillips headed to the North Pole for the ‘Arctic Rugby Challenge’, joining a 100-mile trek to the Magnetic North Pole where he hosted the ‘Most Northerly Rugby Match’, breaking the Guinness World Record.

Cycle race across America (RAAM) - 3000 miles across America, from California to Maryland.

Mount Kilimanjaro - In October 2018 Ollie led a team with 360-expeditions to Uhuru Peak, the highest point in Africa at 5,895 metres.

PWC Director 
Ollie is Director for Real Estate & Construction at PWC, having earlier headed up innovation at the company in partnership with Google.

Optimist Performance, founded 2018 
Ollie founded OptimistPerformance.com to provide a platform to deliver his positive messages and his experience as an advisor, coach and motivational speaker. Ollie delivers leadership, teamwork and culture workshops for a wide variety of global clients including Google, Accenture, Tesco, Schlumberger, Gatorade, UBS Wealth management, AJG, Clear Channel, Casewise, TBWA and Dark Horses. He is also the co-host of a UK based podcast called The Growth Show

Rugby Awards 

IRB International Sevens Player of the Year 2009
Voted French Overseas Player of the Year, 2011

References

External links 
Optimist Performance website
England Sevens Profile

1983 births
Living people
English rugby union players
Rugby union wings
Rugby union fullbacks
Expatriate rugby union players in France
World Rugby Awards winners
English expatriate rugby union players
English expatriate sportspeople in France
Alumni of Van Mildert College, Durham
Durham University RFC players
Rugby union players from Brighton